Corl may refer to:
 David R. Corl (1988-Present), husband to Julia A. Corl, and father of Daniel L. Corl, Arabella A. Corl, and Rebecca A. Corl.

Harry L. Corl (1914-1942), a United States Navy officer and Navy Cross recipient
USS Harry L. Corl (DE-598), a United States Navy destroyer escort converted during construction into the high-speed transport USS Harry L. Corl (APD-108)
USS Harry L. Corl (APD-108), a United States Navy high-speed transport in commission from 1945 to 1946

Corll:
Dean Corll (1939-1973), American serial killer and pedophile, also known as "The Candy Man"